= Kazuna Kanajiri =

Japanese social worker

Kazuna Kanajiri (金尻 カズナ, Kanajiri Kazuna; born 1981) is a Japanese social worker. She is the Chief Director of PAPS, The Organization for Pornography and Sexual Exploitation Survivors.

Kanajiri was born in Osaka Prefecture in 1981. She was a network and systems engineer. In 2004, she started activities to appeal to society about the seriousness of pornographic damage. On the other hand, she worked in the sex industry for about five years because of poverty. At the time, she was unaware that she was a victim of the sex industry which was infringing on human rights. She was able to quit the sex industry with the support of a social worker. Since 2011, she has been involved in consultation support of people who face difficulties in the sex industry.

Since 2020, she has been campaigning for smartphones to have standard features that prevent sexual images from being taken. This aims to reduce the damage caused by sexual images taken with smartphones.

The legal age of adulthood in Japan was lowered from 20 to 18 on April 1, 2022. Young people aged 18 and 19 are no longer legally protected as minors because they are now treated as adults. Kanajiri is calling for legislation to save young victims who are newly preyed on by the sex industry.
